School of Art and Design may refer to:

United States
Herron School of Art and Design, Indianapolis, Indiana
High School of Art and Design, Manhattan, New York City
New England School of Art and Design, Boston, Massachusetts

United Kingdom
Bath School of Art and Design Bath, England
Central School of Art and Design (1896–1989), London, England
Coventry School of Art and Design, Coventry, England
Nottingham Trent University, School of Art and Design, Nottingham, England
Putney School of Art and Design Putney, London, England

Other countries
Limerick School of Art and Design, Limerick, Ireland
Joshibi High School of Art and Design, Tokyo, Japan
School of Art and Design (Łódź), Poland

See also
National Association of Schools of Art and Design
School of Arts (disambiguation)
School of the Arts (disambiguation)
School of Design (disambiguation)